Zhouia spongiae is a Gram-negative, rod-shaped and non-motile bacterium from the genus of Zhouia which has been isolated from a sponge from the Yangpu Bay on Hainan.

References

Flavobacteria
Bacteria described in 2018